The Myrtle Beach 250 was a NASCAR Busch Series stock car race held at Myrtle Beach Speedway, in Myrtle Beach, South Carolina. Added to the Busch Series schedule in 1988, Myrtle Beach Speedway hosted one race per year through the 2000 season, after which it was removed from the schedule. The first three races held were 200 laps, covering . The distance was extended to 250 laps starting in 1991, where it remained for the rest of the race's history. Jimmy Spencer and Jeff Green were the only drivers to win twice in this race. Spencer won at both the 200 and 250 laps race lengths, while Green won the final two races ever held at Myrtle Beach.

Two other short tracks, Nashville Speedway USA and South Boston Speedway, were also removed from the Busch Series schedule after the 2000 season. This extra room created on the schedule was used to help add new races at Chicagoland Speedway, Kansas Speedway, Nashville Superspeedway, and Kentucky Speedway starting in 2001.

Past winners

References

External links
 

Former NASCAR races
NASCAR Xfinity Series races
 
Sports in Myrtle Beach, South Carolina